The Las Vegas Monorail is a  automated monorail mass transit system located adjacent to the Las Vegas Strip in Clark County, Nevada, United States.  It connects several large casinos in the unincorporated communities of Paradise and Winchester, and does not enter the city of Las Vegas proper. Built at a cost of $650 million, it was privately owned and operated by the Las Vegas Monorail Company until their 2020 bankruptcy when it was sold to the Las Vegas Convention and Visitors Authority, a local government agency. In 2013, total annual ridership was roughly 4.2 million, down from a pre-Great Recession peak of 7.9 million in 2007.  The monorail is a registered not-for-profit corporation, allowed under Nevada law since the monorail provides a public service.  The State of Nevada assisted in bond financing, but no public money was used in construction.

History

1995–2002: MGM Grand-Bally's Monorail
The Las Vegas Monorail began service as the MGM Grand-Bally's Monorail in 1995. This system ran between the MGM Grand and Bally's hotels using two used Mark IV monorail trains that had operated on the Walt Disney World Monorail.  Built through a partnership between the two hotels, the MGM-Bally's system's construction was contracted to VSL Corporation. The grand opening party for the monorail featured showgirls from Bally's famed show, Jubilee!, helping groups to the monorail. Characters from The Wizard of Oz greeted the groups on the MGM side. The two trains each ran back and forth on each beam, and were stored at a maintenance building near the Bally's station (this building still stands today, but it has been severed from the beam).

2002–present: Las Vegas Monorail
In 2002, the original system was closed to begin its conversion to the current Las Vegas Monorail system.  The beam was extended from Bally's station (now the Bally's & Paris station) north to the Sahara Hotel and Casino. The track was extended south beyond the MGM station to provide for track switching for the trains, as well as a starting point for a potential future southern extension.  The original trains were replaced with nine new Bombardier Mark VI monorail trains.

During testing and commissioning, the monorail suffered several malfunctions that delayed the start of passenger service for almost a year.  The most serious of these problems related to parts falling from the monorail to the ground under the tracks. After many delays, the finished Las Vegas Monorail opened to the public on July 15, 2004 with the completion and testing of "Phase 1".

On September 8, 2004, more problems with falling parts led to the closing of the monorail for nearly four months. It reopened on December 24, 2004.  A number of repairs were made to the monorail cars during this shutdown.  Each time the monorail system required major engineering changes, it underwent a lengthy "commissioning" process to confirm the effectiveness and safety of the repairs.  Officials reported that each day the monorail was down cost the system approximately $85,000 in lost fares.

Transit Systems Management officials cited the successful handling of crowds during the 2005 Consumer Electronics Show as proof that the system could handle a major convention.

On July 8, 2005, Transit Systems Management announced that it would shut down, turning over its responsibilities to the Las Vegas Monorail Company, the system operator.  Curtis Myles, a former deputy general manager of the Regional Transportation Commission of Southern Nevada, became President of the Las Vegas Monorail Company. 

On November 1, 2005, the County Commission approved a study into the feasibility of an airport extension.

On January 13, 2010, the Las Vegas Monorail filed for Chapter 11 bankruptcy protection. The filing did not affect system operations and had no impact on the monorail's hours of operation or service to its customers.

On March 11, 2011, the Sahara announced that it would close its doors May 16, 2011. Closure of the Sahara has been cited as one of the significant reasons for ridership dropping in 2012. In 2014, a new hotel casino, the SLS Las Vegas, took over the Sahara, and ridership increased from 2012 levels.

The Las Vegas Monorail again filed for Chapter 11 bankruptcy protection in September 2020, amid the COVID-19 pandemic and in December a deal was finalized to transfer ownership to the Las Vegas Convention and Visitors Authority.

An extension to the MSG Sphere at The Venetian was planned but put on hold in 2020. A report in 2022 confirmed that talks of an extension wouldn't resume until after the venue's opening.

Operations 
The monorail (Phase 1 of the overall project) begins at the MGM Grand near the south end of The Strip, and runs roughly parallel to the Strip on its eastern side. The monorail passes next to the Convention Center and the Westgate Las Vegas, both with stations, before ending at the Sahara hotel at the north end of the Strip.

The monorail generally runs behind the eastern Strip side hotels and casinos, a long block away from the Strip. Usually, it requires a walk through a casino to get to the Strip, emerging upon the Strip in front of the property.  This lack of a direct presence on the Strip along with ticket prices has been a factor in the rather slow acceptance of the monorail.

System name and sponsorship

The Las Vegas Monorail was named the Robert N. Broadbent Las Vegas Monorail in honor of Robert N. Broadbent, whom Las Vegas officials credit with gaining the support from the public and officials needed to bring the monorail to fruition. Broadbent, a former Boulder City mayor, Clark County commissioner, assistant secretary of the United States Department of the Interior, and McCarran International Airport director, died in 2003, a few months before the system's scheduled opening. The Las Vegas Monorail Company is the company's official corporate name.

The Las Vegas Monorail generates revenue from ticketed passengers and from corporate sponsors.  Branding rights for the seven stations and the nine trains are available, and the sponsorship prices are in the millions of dollars.  Hansens Beverage sponsored the first monorail train, featuring its Monster Energy drink.  Nextel Communications created a totally themed pavilion by branding the largest station, adjacent to the Las Vegas Convention Center.  Since the Sprint-Nextel merger in late 2005, Nextel Central was rebranded as Sprint Central.  However, in late February 2008, the Sprint Nextel Corporation terminated its sponsorship contract.

Construction and planning
The Las Vegas Monorail was designed by Gensler of Nevada, engineered by Las Vegas-based Carter & Burgess (now Jacobs Engineering Group, Inc.) and constructed by Granite Construction, Inc. of Watsonville, California, one of the largest civil contractors in the United States.

The Las Vegas Monorail vehicles and signal systems were developed by Bombardier Transportation. The technology for the monorail vehicles came directly from the well-tested monorail systems running in Walt Disney World.  Bombardier constructed Mark VI Monorail trains for the Walt Disney World Monorail System and for Las Vegas.

Stations
Stations listed from north to south:

Trains

The monorail uses nine fully automatic Bombardier MVI trains, each consisting of four cars. These are very similar to the six-car Mark VI monorails at Walt Disney World (which were operated by pilots until 2014). The guideway is built to the "ALWEG" track standard. For the first seven years, the line only ran as the MGM Shuttle, between MGM and Bally's stations. During this time, two ex-Walt Disney World Mark IV monorail trains were used. Though the Las Vegas and related train equipment appear superficially similar to the original ALWEG design (as exemplified by the Seattle system), their suspension and propulsion systems differ substantially. A Seattle train may be walked end-to-end which is impossible on a Las Vegas or Florida train. The ALWEG Mark VI system used in Las Vegas Monorail consists of two inline large truck tires per car that support the load over the concrete guideway with a rectangular cross section and eight guide tires that straddle the guideway from both sides. The total capacity of the four-car trains is roughly equivalent to two articulated buses at 80 seated and 160 standing passengers.

Extensions

To Downtown Las Vegas 
Construction was planned to begin in 2005 with service starting in 2008. However, the anticipated funding from the federal government was not allocated in 2004, so the plans were put on hold. On January 27, 2005, the federal government announced that it would not provide money for the $400-million project.

The plan was to open the system in January 2004, and for it to cover its debts and operating expenses by attracting 19 to 20 million riders.  Since the system was not only delayed in opening, but later shut down for four months, income was not as great as organizers had hoped.  This reportedly is a contributing factor for the government's denial of Phase 2 funding.

Southern extension 
Phase 2 was revised to instead extend the monorail system south from the MGM Grand Station to McCarran Field (now Harry Reid International Airport).  Providing monorail service to the airport has been an unpopular idea with limousine and taxicab operators in the city, as trips to and from the airport form a major portion of their business. Several hotel and casino owners on the Strip supported the project, and were more supportive of an extension to the airport than one to downtown Las Vegas.

On December 7, 2006, Clark County commissioners granted permission for the proposed extension to Harry Reid Airport.  Funding had not yet been identified.

On September 9, 2008, the monorail company provided details of the proposed expansion to the Las Vegas Convention and Visitors Authority board. The intended airport extension would begin at the new Terminal 3, with the first stop near Terminal 1, turn north on Swenson Street, then continue west on Tropicana Avenue before turning north at Koval Lane to meet up with the existing system behind the MGM Grand. This route was proposed to be built with private funds and would have added approximately four miles to the existing route, doubling the length of the system.

When the monorail company announced details of the extension in September 2008, the airport extension was to be built with private funds and was expected to be built by 2012.  However, as of March 2011, the Las Vegas Monorail Company was still in the planning phases of the proposed extension to Harry Reid International Airport with a proposed stop on the UNLV campus.

The monorail company announced in May 2015 that it is proposing instead an extension to the Mandalay Bay Resort and Casino and an infill station at the Sands Expo & Convention Center. Subsequently, the Regional Transportation Commission of Southern Nevada announced that a new underground light rail system under the Las Vegas Strip, which would connect Downtown Las Vegas with the airport, is in the long-term planning phase.

Mandalay Bay extension 
In March 2018, the Clark County Commission approved a proposed extension to Mandalay Bay, putting the monorail closer to Allegiant Stadium. The monorail company planned to start construction on the extension in June 2018 and have it completed by September 2020, in time for the completion of the stadium and Las Vegas Raiders inaugural season in Las Vegas. In November 2018 it was confirmed that two new Monorail stations would be built; one at Mandalay Bay and another at the MSG Sphere with completion by 2021. In May 2019, it was revealed that lack of funding has delayed the start of construction on a Mandalay Bay extension. As of March 2020, there is no timetable to begin construction on an extension nor a completion date.

See also 

 List of monorail systems
 List of rail transit systems in North America

Resort trams 
 Aria Express
 Mandalay Bay Tram
 Mirage-Treasure Island Tram

References

External links 

 
 Robert N. Broadbent Las Vegas Monorail, Nevada at Monorails.org
 Ridership Graph 2005–2006
 Rail transit map of Las Vegas (to scale)

Monorails
Urban people mover systems
Alweg people movers
Railway lines opened in 2004
Monorails in the United States
People mover systems in the United States
Electric railways in Nevada
 
Las Vegas Strip
Nevada railroads
Passenger rail transportation in Nevada
Rapid transit in Nevada
Transportation in the Las Vegas Valley
750 V DC railway electrification
2004 establishments in Nevada
Companies that filed for Chapter 11 bankruptcy in 2020